is a town located in central Tanegashima, in Kumage District, Kagoshima Prefecture, Japan.

As of June 2013, the town has an estimated population of 8,439 and a population density of 61.2 persons per km². The total area is 137.78 km².

Geography
Nakatane occupies the center of the island of Tanegashima, with the East China Sea to the west and the Pacific Ocean to the east.

Surrounding municipalities
Nishinoomote
Minamitane
Mishima

Climate
The climate is classified as humid subtropical (Köppen climate classification Cfa) with very warm summers and mild winters. Precipitation is high throughout the year, but is highest in the months of May, June and September.

History
Nakatane Village was established on April 1, 1889. A power station was built in 1925, and the first telephone was installed in 1938. On November 10, 1940, Nakatane was upgraded to town status. Tanegashima Airport opened in Nakatane in 1958.

Nakatane is featured in the Japanese animated feature film, 5 Centimeters Per Second, directed by Makoto Shinkai. It was released on March 3, 2007 in Japan.

Transport

Highway
Japan National Route 58

Airport
New Tanegashima Airport

References

External links

Nakatane official website 

Towns in Kagoshima Prefecture
Populated coastal places in Japan